Pitchford Hall is a large Grade I listed Tudor country house in the village of Pitchford, Shropshire, 6 miles south east of Shrewsbury.

It was built c.1560 on the site of a medieval building and has been modified several times since, particularly in the 1870s and 1880s when it was substantially restored, remodelled and extended. It is a timber framed two-storey building with rendered red sandstone panels, a stone roof and brick chimneys. The floor plan is E-shaped round a courtyard to the south with a Victorian service wing to the west. There is also an orangery and walled garden in the grounds.

A deer park established in 1638 was disparked in 1790. 100 metres north of the hall is a bitumen well, near a ford across the Row Brook, from which the village gets its name. The bitumen or pitch was once used for waterproofing the timbers of the house. A Tudor style tree-house sits in a large lime tree and is believed to be the oldest tree house in the world.

The hall was sold by Caroline Colthurst, the owner of the Pitchford Estate, in 1992. It has, however, recently been reunited with the Pitchford Estate (28 September 2016) by Caroline's daughter, Rowena Colthurst and her husband James Nason.

A stretch of the Roman Watling Street runs through the estate.

History
There has been a manor house on the site since around 1284, the estate at the time being in the possession of the de Pykeford family. Geoffrey de Pykeford, a crusader, was lord of the manor from 1272 and built the local church of St Michael, which contains an oak effigy of him. Eventually, however, the family had to sell the estate to the church in the 1330s in order to repay debts.

Thomas Ottley bought the Manor of Pitchford in 1473. The present house was built c.1560 for Adam Ottley, a Shrewsbury wool merchant, and possibly incorporated elements of the previous medieval structure. The estate remained in the Ottley family until the death of his descendant, another Adam Ottley in 1807. The hall and estate then passed to Hon. Charles C. C. Jenkinson, second son of the 1st Earl of Liverpool and later to his son-in-law John Cotes. John's son Charles Cotes commissioned the London architect George Devey to renovate and upgrade the house, which included the installation of replacement windows, baths and water closets. Charles died unmarried and the estate passed in 1918 to his brother-in-law Lieut-General Sir Robert Grant. Until 1992, the Colthurst family were in possession and carried out further restoration to the hall under the guidance of English Heritage and Andrew Arrol. 

The house was visited in 1832 by Princess (later Queen) Victoria, who watched a fox hunt from the treehouse, and wrote in her diary the hall was "A curious looking but very comfortable house. It is striped black and white, and in the shape of a cottage".

Next century it was visited in 1935 by the Duke and Duchess of York (later King George VI and Queen Elizabeth). During the Second World War, Pitchford was one of the country retreats selected to house the Royal Family should they need be evacuated from the capital (see Coats Mission) in case of an invasion of Britain. Other stately homes in England were selected as backups, with Hatley Castle, on Vancouver Island in Canada as the final option in case German troops reached the Midlands. If that last resort option was required, the family was to travel to Holyhead for transport to Canada by the Royal Navy.

Pitchford Church (CofE), opposite the hall, is open to the public and holds services once or twice a month.

A former Great Western Railway Hall class locomotive No 4953, now running on the Epping Ongar Railway, was named Pitchford Hall.

Major restorations 
Between 1883 and 1889, the hall was significantly renovated and modified by  George Devey but by the 20th Century, major renovations were again required.

The National Trust were unable to finance a purchase of the hall when it was being sold by the Colthurst family. It was sold to another purchaser, but the new owner left it vacant and closed. In 2016, Rowena Colthurst and James Nason, the subsequent owners of the full Estate, also bought the hall and had a long-term plan to restore and reopen it. At that time, the hall had been neglected for a quarter of a century. 

As of 2019, the Grade I listed hall (Entry Number: 1177907) has not been open to the public for nearly 30 years, and is on Historic England's Buildings at Risk Register (page 14). The new owners have committed to reopening it after a major restoration, under a Section 106 Planning Agreement. That effort was underway in late 2019 with a view to a future reopening. By 2019, the west wing, or General's Quarters building, had been renovated and was open for holiday rental. The family were in the process of raising funds to help finance the continuing restoration of the other sections of the hall.

See also
Grade I listed buildings in Shropshire
Listed buildings in Pitchford
Coats Mission

References

External links
 Pitchford estate
 Midlands Today Report 5 December 2017 
 

Grade I listed buildings in Shropshire
Country houses in Shropshire
Grade I listed houses
Tudor architecture